Kampong Menglait is a village in Brunei-Muara District, Brunei, as well as a neighbourhood and commercial area in the capital Bandar Seri Begawan. The population was 2,262 in 2016. It is one of the villages within Mukim Gadong 'B'. The postcode is BE3919.

References 

Villages in Brunei-Muara District
Neighbourhoods in Bandar Seri Begawan